Group A of the 2003 Fed Cup Asia/Oceania Zone Group I was one of two pools in the Asia/Oceania Zone Group I of the 2003 Fed Cup. Five teams competed in a round robin competition, with the top two teams advancing to the play-offs and the bottom team being relegated to Group II for next year.

Japan vs. South Korea

New Zealand vs. Hong Kong

China vs. Hong Kong

Japan vs. New Zealand

China vs. Japan

South Korea vs. New Zealand

China vs. New Zealand

South Korea vs. Hong Kong

China vs. South Korea

Japan vs. Hong Kong

  failed to win any ties in the pool, and thus was relegated to Group II in 2004. However, they did not compete next year.

See also
Fed Cup structure

References

External links
 Fed Cup website

2003 Fed Cup Asia/Oceania Zone